Fun Factory was a children's programme on the satellite television channel Sky Channel (later to become Sky One) that ran from 1985 to 1994. It continued as a programming block without a host up until 1994.

Original Programme
It was originally hosted by Mr P, who was later replaced by Andy Sheldon, Snoot the seal and Crocker the crocodile. The programme included cartoons such as:
 Ghostbusters
 Transformers
 He-Man and the Masters of the Universe
 Jem
 Inspector Gadget
 M.A.S.K.
 Jayce and the Wheeled Warriors
 Lady Lovely Locks
 The Care Bears
 BlackStar
 The Family-Ness
 Denver, the Last Dinosaur
 Barrier Reef
 Ivanhoe
 Emily
 The Toothbrush Family
 SuperTed
 Police Academy
 C.O.P.S.
 Roger Ramjet
 Starcom: The U.S. Space Force
 The Challenge of the GoBots
 Choppy and the Princess
 The Get Along Gang

Second Incarnation
After Sky Channel's renaming to Sky One in 1989, the Fun Factory name was used for a weekend block programming strand showing nothing but animated series, notably without any live-action presenters in-between the programmes - just animated interstitials. This version of the Fun Factory lasted from 1991 to September 1994, when it was replaced with The DJ Kat Show weekend spin-off, KTV. A partial list of series shown on the Sky One-era Fun Factory include:
 Barbie 
 Barbie and the Rockers (UK Title: Barbie and The Rock Stars)
 Beverly Hills Teens
 BraveStarr
 Charlie Brown
 Dick Tracy
 Fat Albert and the Cosby Kids
 Inspector Gadget
 Jayce and the Wheeled Warriors
 The Little Mermaid
 The Marvel Superheroes
 M.A.S.K.
 Mrs. Pepperpot
 My Little Pony 
 My Little Pony Tales 
 The New Adventures of Superman
 Peter Pan
 The Plastic Man Comedy/Adventure Show
 Pole Position
 Police Academy
 Silverhawks
 Super Jem (Super Jem – Series 2: Super Jem Duo (Jem – Series 5: Super Jem Duo)) 
 Star Trek: The Animated Series
 Teenage Mutant Hero Turtles
 Transformers
 Visionaries: Knights of the Magical Light

References

External links 

1985 British television series debuts
1994 British television series endings
1980s British children's television series
1990s British children's television series
Sky UK original programming
British television shows featuring puppetry
English-language television shows